Mahdi Ahouie (born 1977) is an Iranian political scientist and assistant professor of international politics and head of the Department of Iranian Studies at the University of Tehran. He has also been Post-doctoral Research Fellow at the Foundation for Interreligious and Intercultural Research and Dialogue in Geneva. Ahouie is known for his research on Israel's foreign policy, Middle Eastern politics and Iranian foreign relations.

See also
Ahmad Sayyed Javadi
Middle power
Israel lobby in the United States

References

External links
Mahdi Ahouie at University of Tehran

Living people
Iranian political scientists
1977 births
Academic staff of the University of Tehran
Academic staff of the Faculty of World Studies
Graduate Institute of International and Development Studies alumni